The Downtown Bend Library is a library in Bend, Oregon, United States. The two-story,  building was designed by the Portland-based Thomas Hacker and Associates, and opened in 1998.

References

1998 establishments in Oregon
Buildings and structures in Bend, Oregon
Libraries in Oregon
Library buildings completed in 1998